Ulrike Denk (born 10 May 1964 in Cologne) is a German former athlete who competed in the sprint hurdles. In 1983, she broke the world junior record in the 60 metres hurdles with 8.06, which was only broken in 2015 by Dior Hall. Denk represented West Germany at the 1984 Summer Olympics, finishing seventh, and 1983 World Championships, reaching the semifinals.

Her personal bests are 12.84 seconds in the 100 metres hurdles (+1.1 m/s; Stuttgart 1985) and 7.91 seconds in the 60 metres hurdles (Madrid 1986).

International competitions

References

1964 births
Living people
West German female hurdlers
World Athletics Championships athletes for West Germany
Athletes from Cologne
Athletes (track and field) at the 1984 Summer Olympics
Olympic athletes of West Germany